The Cullum Geographical Medal is one of the oldest awards of the American Geographical Society. It was established in the will of George Washington Cullum, the vice president of the Society, and is awarded "to those who distinguish themselves by geographical discoveries or in the advancement of geographical science". It was first awarded in 1896 to Robert Peary. The gold medal was designed by Lydia Field Emmet.

"On the front is the figure of a young man standing in the bow of a boat. He has thrown down his oars upon discovering land. He shades his eyes with his hand as the boat progresses through the waves. A sea gull, hovering, indicates the proximity of land. The whole is supposed to represent enterprise and the spirit of exploration. Inscribed on the face of the medal is: The American Geographical Society of New York."

"The reverse, to typify achievement and award, bears a female figure – Columbia, the left hand resting on a globe and the right holding out a laurel wreath. Beneath the right arm is the tablet to bear the record of the achievement for which the award is made. On the side is the inscription: The Cullum Geographical Medal."

Recipients 
Source: American Geographical Society

 1896: Robert Peary
 1897: Fridtjof Nansen
 1899: John Murray
 1901: Thomas C. Mendenhall
 1902: A. Donaldson Smith
 1903: Prince Luigi Amedeo
 1904: Georg von Neumayer, Sven Hedin
 1906: Robert Bell, Robert Falcon Scott
 1908: William Morris Davis
 1909: Francisco Moreno, Ernest Shackleton
 1910: Hermann Wagner
 1911: Jean-Baptiste Charcot
 1914: John Scott Keltie, Ellen Churchill Semple
 1917: George W. Goethals
 1918: Frederick Haynes Newell
 1919: Emmanuel de Margerie, Henry Fairfield Osborn
 1921: Albert I, Prince of Monaco
 1922: Edward A. Reeves
 1924: Jovan Cvijić
 1925: Lucien Gallois, Harvey C. Hayes, Pedro C. Sánchez
 1929: Jean Brunhes, Alfred Hettner, Hugh Robert Mill, Jules de Schokalsky
 1930: Curtis F. Marbut
 1931: Mark Jefferson
 1932: Bertram Thomas
 1935: Douglas Johnson
 1938: Louise Arner Boyd
 1939: Emmanuel de Martonne
 1940: Robert Cushman Murphy
 1943: Arthur Robert Hinks
 1948: Hugh Hammond Bennett
 1950: Hans Wilhelmsson Ahlmann
 1952: Roberto Almagià
 1954: 1953 British Mount Everest expedition
 1956: J. Russell Smith
 1958: C. W. Thornthwaite
 1959: Albert P. Crary
 1961: Maurice Ewing
 1962: Richard Joel Russell
 1963: Rachel Carson
 1964: John Leighly
 1965: Kirtley F. Mather
 1967: Peter Haggett
 1968: Luna Leopold
 1969: Neil Armstrong, Buzz Aldrin, Michael Collins
 1973: Bruce Heezen
 1975: René Dubos
 1985: Chauncy Harris
 1987: Kenneth Hare, Yi-Fu Tuan
 1989: M. Gordon Wolman
 1997: Melvin G. Marcus
 1999: Jack Dangermond, David Lowenthal
 2001: Wilbur Zelinsky
 2009: Peter Smith, Matthew Henson
 2014: Lee Schwartz

See also

 List of geography awards

Footnotes

Sources

Further reading 
 .

External links 
 

 
Awards established in 1896
Awards of the American Geographical Society
1896 establishments in the United States